Natural Thing is the debut studio album by American singer Tanya Blount, released on March 8, 1994 under Polydor Records. The album peaked at No. 58 on the Billboard Top R&B Albums chart and features the top 40 R&B hit, "Through the Rain", "I'm Gonna Make You Mine" and "Hold On".

Critical reception 

AllMusic editor William Ruhlmann called Blount a "competent but unexceptional R&B singer". He found that with Natural Thing she undertook to copy the quiet storm formula of Anita Baker on her debut album [...] but nothing about the record suggested she would be any real competition to Baker or other adult Black pop figures any time soon."

Track listing

Notes
 denotes additional producer(s)
 denotes co-producer(s)

Charts

References

1994 albums
Tanya Blount albums
Polydor Records albums